Loeriesfontein is a small town in the Northern Cape of South Africa. It falls within what is known as the Hantam region.

The town

Location 

The town of Loeriesfontein is within a basin surrounded by mountains, and it is accessed from the N7 highway (north out of Cape Town), turning off on the R27 at Van Rhynsdorp to Nieuwoudtville, then following the R357 to Loeriesfontein (a further 65 km north).

Local government 

Loeriesfontein became a municipality in 1958, but it has since lost that status in a re-organization of municipal responsibilities that incorporated it into Hantam Local Municipality.

History and context 

The town grew around a general store established in 1894 by a travelling Bible salesman, named Fredrick Turner, the son of the sister of Charles Spurgeon. He came from Norwich, England. The store still exists. It is currently owned by Victor Haupt, the grandson of Fredrick Turner. The shop is currently called Turner & Haupt SPAR, and is 113 years in the family. 

Southwestern Loeriesfontein forms part of the wider region known as Namaqualand, an area well known for its spring flowers (August and September) and its great variety of different plants - some 4,000 varieties are said to be evident in this region.  The flowers attract visitors to the region, but at other times agriculture (sheep) and mining (salt) are the main commercial activities.

Loeriesfontein Renewable Energy
The Loeriesfontein and Khobab Wind Farms are part of the South African Government’s Round 3 Renewable Energy Independent Power Producer Procurement Programme (REIPPP) and are managed both in terms of construction and operations by Mainstream Renewable Power South Africa. The Loeriesfontein and Khobab Wind Farms, are expected to be operational by December 2017.
Situated in the Northern Cape, which has the highest volume of renewable energy utility power plants in the country, these sister wind farms comprise a total of 122 wind turbine generators, spanning 6,653 hectares.  Collectively the wind farms will power circa 240,000 South African households, positively impacting the country’s economy and its people. 

The two wind farms achieved over 2 million man-hours of construction activity without a single lost-time-incident during their construction period.  “Considering the sheer scale of these power projects, the multiple levels of activities and the complexities involved in building these very large wind farms, it is an impressive achievement for our construction team.

Places of interest

Windmill Museum 

The late Dr Walton, a British born Capetonian was well known for his interest in different aspects of conservation, including the conservation of water-pumping windmills or windpumps.  He wrote a book on this subject with the late Mr André Pretorius ("Windpumps in South Africa", published by Human and Rousseau in 1998 but currently out of print).  In order to share this collected knowledge with a wider audience, he invited potentially interested organisations and places to start a windpump museum.  The Fred Turner museum at Loeriesfontein was the only respondent.  Since its establishment there, the museum team and interested persons all over South Africa have sponsored and collected 27 windpumps, now assembled and on display.

Fred Turner folk and culture museum 

The culture and historical way of life of the "Trek Farmers" of Namaqualand (also known as Bushmanland or Hantam) is displayed in this museum which is housed in the old school adjacent to the Windmill display (which is in what was the school playground).  More than 1000 items are on display, including a trek wagon, equipped tent, kook skerm and a horse mill.

Salt pans 

100 km from Loeriesfontein in the spacious plains of Bushmanland are salt pans (dwaggas) that are still in production.

Quiver trees 

Large quiver trees (sometimes referred to as "Aloes") can be seen on the road from Nieuwoudtville to Louriesfontein

Events

Flowers in season 
The area is famous for the display of wild flowers in the season, principally during August and September.  This is the time when most visitors come to the area.

Thanksgiving Weekend 

The annual Thanksgiving Weekend - in the form of a traditional church fête, takes place on the first weekend of the September/October school holiday.

Agricultural show 

An annual agricultural show is well established and takes place in October.  It has status at the provincial and national levels and focuses on sheep and saddle horses.

References

Populated places established in 1894
Populated places in the Hantam Local Municipality
Museums in the Northern Cape
Karoo
1894 establishments in the Cape Colony